Catherine Leutenegger (born 1983 in Lausanne) is a Swiss visual artist and photographer. She has been the recipient of many awards, including the Manor Cultural Prize, the Raymond Weil International Photography Prize and the Swiss Design Awards 2006 and 2008.

Life and work
In 2001 Leutenegger gained a Baccalauréat, Certificat maturité Fédérale en section Arts Visuels, from Gymnase du Bugnon, Switzerland. In 2005 she gained a Bachelor in Visual Communication / Photography from École cantonale d'art de Lausanne (ECAL) in Switzerland. In 2007 she gained a Master in Photography, University of Art and Design from ECAL.

Her first book was titled Hors-champ and showed photographers' workspaces. It was published in 2006 by Infolio Publisher through the Manor Cultural Prize. This included a cash award and an exhibition at Musée de l’Elysée in Lausanne curated by William A. Ewing. In 2007, while taking part in an artist residency program in New York City, she started her project named The Kodak City. Her second photo essay, the Kodak City, was published on 9 September 2014 and looked at the demise of the once booming Kodak empire. It has been published online by Kehrer Verlag.

Exhibitions
Musée de l'Elysée, Lausanne
Carla Sozzani Gallery, Milan
Aperture Gallery, New York
Museum für Gestaltung, Zürich
Museum Bellerive, Zürich
Fotomuseum Winterthur
Bieler Fototage, Biel
International Photography Festival, Leipzig

Fellowships and awards
2005, Banque Cantonale Vaudoise Encouragement Prize
2006, Manor Cultural Prize, Lausanne
2006, Swiss Federal Design Grants
2007, Artist's Studio Grant (Canton de Vaud), Residency in New York City
2008, Swiss Federal Design Grants
2008, The Raymond Weil Club, International Photography Prize

References

20th-century Swiss photographers
1983 births
Living people
Swiss women photographers
Swiss contemporary artists
21st-century Swiss photographers
20th-century women photographers
21st-century women photographers